North Premier was a level five league in the English rugby union system, with the fourteen teams drawn from across Northern England. The other leagues at this level were London & South East Premier, Midlands Premier and South West Premier. The RFU reorganised the level five leagues for season 2022–23, with an increase from four to six and reducing the teams in each from fourteen to twelve. The teams in this league now play in either Regional 1 North East or Regional 1 North West.

Format
The fourteen teams in this league were drawn from across northern England with the champions promoted to National League 2 North and the runner-up going into a play-off with the second placed team from Midlands Premier with the winner also being promoted. The league's bottom three teams are relegated to either North 1 East or North 1 West depending on their geographic location. The league was changed at the beginning of the 2009–10 season following reorganisation by the Rugby Football Union when the league was originally known as North Division 1.  A further name change from  National League 3 North to its final name for the 2017–18 season by the RFU in order to lessen confusion for the series of regional leagues.

The season ran from September to May and comprised twenty-six rounds of matches, with each club playing each of its rivals home and away. The results of the matches contributed points to the league table as follows:
    4 points are awarded for a win
    2 points are awarded for a draw
    0 points are awarded for a loss, however
    1 losing (bonus) point is awarded to a team that loses a match by 7 points or fewer
    1 additional (bonus) point is awarded to a team scoring 4 tries or more in a match

2021–22
Nine of the fourteen teams participated in the previous season's competition. They were joined by Otley and Preston Grasshoppers who were relegated from National League 2 North, and promoted sides York (from North 1 East) together with Burnage and Northwich RUFC (both from North 1 West).

The previous season's champions Blaydon were promoted into National League 2 North alongside Harrogate (who won the virtual play-off against Newport runners-up in Midlands Premier), while the relegated teams were Carlisle RFC (to North 1 West) together with Morpeth and Ilkley RFC (both to North 1 East).

The teams competing in 2021–22 achieved their places in the league based on performances in 2019–20, the 'previous season' column in the table below refers to that season not 2020–21.

Twelve of the fourteen teams from 2021–22 were placed into one of the new level five leagues for 2022–23. Alnwick, Billingham, Sandal and York were placed into Regional 1 North East while Blackburn, Burnage, Kirkby Lonsdale, Lymm, Macclesfield, Northwich, Rossendale and Wirral were placed into Regional 1 North West. The top two teams in 2021–22, Otley and Preston Grasshoppers, were promoted to the level four league National League 2 North. No teams were relegated to level six.

Participating teams and locations

Final league table

2020–21
On 30th October the RFU announced, that due to the coronavirus pandemic, a decision had been taken to cancel Adult Competitive Leagues (National League 1 and below) for the 2020/21 season meaning North Premier was not contested.

2019–20
Ten of the fourteen teams participated in last season's competition.  They are joined by Macclesfield who were relegated from National League 2 North, and Blackburn, Carlisle and Morpeth who were promoted into the division.  Last season's champions Hull were promoted into National League 2 North, while the relegated teams were Vale of Lune and Wilmslow who all drop down into North 1 West and Kendal Rugby Union Football Club, Kendal who were relegated to North 1 East.

Participating teams and locations

2018–19
Ten of the fourteen teams participated in last season's competition. They are joined by Blaydon who were relegated from National League 2 North, while Alnwick, Vale of Lune and Wilmslow were promoted into the division.  Preston Grasshoppers were promoted as champions into National League 2 North, while the relegated teams were Birkenhead Park (North 1 West), Morley and Pocklington (both North 1 East).

Participating teams and locations

2017–18
Nine of the fourteen teams participated in last season's competition. They are joined by Preston Grasshoppers and Harrogate who were relegated from National League 2 North, while Pocklington, Kirkby Lonsdale and Birkenhead Park are promoted into the division.  Huddersfield were promoted as champions into National League 2 North, with Firwood Waterloo and Stockport both relegated to North 1 West and Cleckheaton dropping to North 1 East.  In order to address an imbalance of teams at tier 5, Doncaster Phoenix were level transferred to Midlands Premier. This season was the first that Kendal played at the new Mint Bridge Stadium.

Participating teams and locations

Final league table

2016–17
Nine of the fourteen teams participated in last season's competition. They are joined by Huddersfield and Sandal who were relegated from National 2 North while Doncaster Phoenix, Morley and Kendal were promoted into the league. Sheffield Tigers were promoted as champions into National 2 North while Burnage and Huddersfield Y.M.C.A. were relegated to North 1 East and Birkenhead Park dropped to North 1 West.  In order to address a league imbalance, 7th placed Sheffield were level transferred to National League 3 Midlands.

Participating teams and locations

Final league table

Promotion play-off
Each season, the runners-up in the National League 3 North, and National League 3 Midlands participate in a play-off for promotion to National League 2 North. The team with the best playing record, in this case Rossendale, host the match and they lost to their opponents Sheffield 31 – 32.

2015–16
Sheffield Tigers, are the champions, winning the league by 16 points. It was Sheffield's second promotion to National 2 North; in 2010–11 they won promotion via the play-off (as Midland representatives), beating Chester. Wirral, the second-placed team lost their play-off match against Hinckley and remain in this league for next season. Three clubs are relegated, Huddersfield YMCA to North East 1, and Birkenhead Park and Burnage, both to North West 1 .

Participating clubs and locations

Nine of the fourteen teams participated in last season's competition. They were joined by two teams relegated from National League 2 North, Hull and Stockport; and by three promoted teams, Birkenhead Park, Ilkley and Sheffield. The teams leaving the league were the 2014–15 champions, Sale who were promoted to National League 2 North, along with the runner-up Sandal, the play-off winner against Hinckley; Morley, South Shields West and Beverley were all relegated to North 1 East.

Final league table

Promotion play-off

Each season, the runners-up in the National League 3 Midland, and National League 3 North participate in a play-off for promotion to National League 2 North. The team with the best playing record, in this case Hinckley, host the match and their opponents are Wirral.

2014–15

Participating clubs

Beverley

Billingham

Burnage

Cleckheaton (promoted from North 1 East)

Firwood Waterloo

Huddersfield Y.M.C.A. (promoted from North 1 East)

Lymm (transferred from National League 3 Midlands)

Morley

Rossendale

Sale

Sandal

Sheffield Tigers (relegated from National League 2 North)

Westoe

Wirral (promoted from North 1 West)

2013–14

Participating clubs

Beverley (promoted from North 1 East)

Billingham

Bradford & Bingley

Burnage

Firwood Waterloo

Huddersfield (relegated from National League 2 North)

Morley (promoted from North 1 East)

Penrith

Percy Park

Rossendale

Sale (promoted from North 1 West)

Sandal

Stockport (relegated from National League 2 North)

Westoe (relegated from National League 2 North)

2012–13

Participating clubs

Billingham  (promoted from North 1 East)

Birkenhead Park

Bradford & Bingley

Burnage

Chester

Harrogate  (relegated from National League 2 North)

Kendal  (relegated from National League 2 North)

Lymm

Penrith

Percy Park (promoted from North 1 East)

Rossendale

Sandal

Waterloo

West Hartlepool

2009–10

Participating clubs

Inaugural clubs (first season as National 3 North)

Beverley (now playing in North 1 East)

Birkenhead Park (still playing in National 3 North)

Chester (now playing in National 2 North)

Cleckheaton (still playing in National 3 North)

Darlington Mowden Park (now playing in National 2 North)

Middlesbrough (now playing in Durham/Northumberland 1)

Morley (now playing in North 1 East)

Penrith (now playing in North 1 West)

Rochdale (now playing in North 1 West)

Rossendale (still playing in National 3 North)

Sheffield Tigers (still playing in National 3 North)

Stockport (still playing in National League 3 North)

West Hartlepool (now playing in North 1 East)

West Park St Helens (now playing in South Lancs/Cheshire 1)

2008–09

Final league table

Original teams
When league rugby began in 1987 this division contained the following teams:

Hartlepool Rovers (now playing in Durham/Northumberland 1)
Harrogate (now playing in National league 2 North) 
Hull & ER (now playing as Hull Ionians in National League 1)
Kendal (now playing in North 1 West
Middlesbrough (now playing in Yorkshire 1)
Otley (now playing in National League 2 North)
Tynedale (now playing in National League 2 North)
Widnes
Wigton
Winnington Park (now playing in South Lancs/Cheshire 1
West Park (now playing in Lancs/Cheshire Division 1

North Premier honours
In the first season of the English rugby union league pyramid, sponsored by Courage, there was four, tier five leagues. The geographical area for teams in the north of England covered the ceremonial counties of Cheshire, Cumbria, Lancashire Northumberland and Yorkshire There were eleven teams in the league and they played each other once, giving each team ten matches. The other tier five leagues were London Division One, Midlands Division One and South West Division One. This system prevailed for five seasons, and in 1992–93 the number of teams increased from eleven to thirteen. The following season (1993–94) the league was reorganised and the four tier five leagues became two; National 5 North and National 5 South. After three seasons, in 1996–97, a further reorganisation occurred, and there was a return to four, tier five leagues; with North Division One covering the area of northern England. This system prevailed until 2009–10 when the number of teams was increased from twelve to fourteen and renamed National League Three North.

North Division 1 (1987–1993)
The original North Division 1 was a tier 5 league with promotion to Area League 2 North and relegation to North Division 2 (later split into two leagues known as North 1 East and North 1 West).

North Division 1 (1993–1996)
At the end of the 1992–93 season the top six teams from North Division 1 and the top six from Midland Division 1 were combined to create National 5 North. North Division 1 dropped from a tier 5 league to a tier 6 league for the years that National 5 North was active.

North Division 1 (1996–2009)
For the end of the 1995–96 season National 5 North was discontinued and North Division One returned to being a tier 5 league. Promotion was to National 4 North (later known as National League 2 North), while relegation continued to North Division 2 until 2000–01, and then into either North 2 East or North 2 West (later known as North 1 East / North 1 West) in subsequent seasons.

National League 3 North (2009–2017)
For the 2009–10 season North Division One was renamed as National League 3 North following a restructuring of the national leagues leading to changes at all levels.

North Premier (2017–2022)
The division was renamed North Premier for the 2017–18 season in order to make it more obvious that this was a regional division and the top one in the north.

Promotion play-offs
From 2000–01 season until 2018–19 there was a play-off, between the league runners-up of North Premier and Midlands Premier, for the third and final promotion place to National League 2 North. The team with the superior league record has home advantage. As of the end of the 2018–19 season the northern teams have been stronger with twelve wins to the Midlands seven, while the home team has won thirteen times compared to the away teams six.

Number of league titles

Bradford & Bingley (2)
Darlington Mowden Park (2)
Huddersfield (2)
Kendal (2)
Morley (2)
Otley (2)
Preston Grasshoppers (2)
Aspatria (1)
Blaydon (1)
Caldy (1)
Chester (1)
Darlington (1)
Doncaster (1)
Halifax (1)
Hull (1)
Manchester (1)
New Brighton (1)
Rotherham (1)
Sale FC (1)
Sandal (1)
Sedgley Park (1)
Sheffield Tigers (1)
Stockport (1)
Tynedale (1)
Westoe (1)
Wharfedale (1)
Winnington Park (1)

See also
 English rugby union system
 Rugby union in England

Notes

References

Defunct rugby union leagues in England
Recurring sporting events established in 1987
Sports leagues established in 1987
Sports leagues disestablished in 2022